Estil 9 is a Spanish television channel, launched in 2010. It was founded and started to broadcast on 2010. Estil 9 currently broadcasts in Catalan.

External links
Official Website

Television stations in Spain
Television channels and stations established in 2010
Women's interest channels
Mass media in Barcelona